Let's Jam is an album by pianist Claude Hopkins with saxophonist Buddy Tate and trumpeter Joe Thomas recorded in 1961 and originally released by the Swingville label.

Track listing
All compositions by Claude Hopkins except where noted
 "Offbeat Blues" – 4:59
 "Safari Stomp" – 5:43
 "Late Evening" (Hopkins, Esmond Edwards) – 6:33
 "The Way You Look Tonight" (Jerome Kern, Dorothy Fields) – 5:14
 "I Apologise" (Al Hoffman, Al Goodhart, Ed Nelson) – 3:47
 "I Surrender Dear" (Harry Barris, Gordon Clifford) – 4:23
 "I Would Do Anything for You" (Hopkins, Alex Hill) – 3:59

Personnel 
Claude Hopkins – piano
Buddy Tate – tenor saxophone, clarinet
Joe Thomas – trumpet
Wendell Marshall – bass
J. C. Heard – drums

References 

1961 albums
Claude Hopkins albums
Buddy Tate albums
Joe Thomas (trumpeter) albums
Swingville Records albums
Albums recorded at Van Gelder Studio
Albums produced by Esmond Edwards